Athabasca Pass (el. ) is a high mountain pass in the Canadian Rockies on the border between Alberta and British Columbia.  In fur trade days it connected Jasper House on the Athabasca River with Boat Encampment on the Columbia River.

The pass lies between Mount Brown and McGillivray Ridge.  It is south of Yellowhead Pass and north of Howse Pass.  The Committee's Punch Bowl, a glacial lake on the continental divide at the summit of the pass, is the headwaters of the Whirlpool River, a tributary of the Athabasca River.  It also has an outlet to Pacific Creek, a tributary of the Columbia River to the south.

Athabaca Pass is first mentioned in the historical record in the papers of British explorer David Thompson, who was shown the route in 1811 by an Iroquois man named Thomas. It became a major point on the fur trade route between Rupert's Land and the Columbia District, used by the York Factory Express. and in recognition of that usage was designated a National Historic Site of Canada in 1971.

See also

 List of Rocky Mountain passes on the continental divide

References

External links 
 Dr. Peter Murphy - La Grande Traverse Part 5 (22 Sept. 2013) — YouTube video of presentation by Dr. Peter Murphy, Professor Emeritus of Forestry with the Department of Renewable Resources, University of Alberta, on the route through Athabasca Pass.

Mountain passes of Alberta
Mountain passes of British Columbia
National Historic Sites in Alberta
National Historic Sites in British Columbia
Canadian Rockies
Jasper National Park
Landforms on the National Historic Sites of Canada register